Giuseppe De Gaetano (born 4 October 1966) is a retired male race walker from Italy.

Biography
He competed for his native country at the 1992 Summer Olympics, finishing in 12th place in the men's 50 km walk event. De Gaetano set his personal best (3:51.54) in the men's 50 km walk event in 1993. He was the son of the Italian Olympic racewalker (Rome 1960) Antonio De Gaetano.

Achievements

See also
 Italy at the IAAF World Race Walking Cup

References

External links
 

1966 births
Living people
Italian male racewalkers
Athletes (track and field) at the 1992 Summer Olympics
Olympic athletes of Italy
Sportspeople from Padua
World Athletics Championships athletes for Italy